Puente la Reina (Spanish meaning literally the "bridge of the Queen") is a town and municipality located in the autonomous community of Navarre, in northern Spain.

Puente la Reina lies between Pamplona and Estella on the Way of St. James pilgrimage route to Santiago de Compostela. It is the first town after the junction of the French Way, the most popular route, and Aragonese Way.

Romanesque bridge
Queen Muniadona, wife of King Sancho III was the queen who gave her name to the town and the bridge, also known as the Puente Románico. She built the six-arched Romanesque bridge over the Arga for the use of pilgrims on their way to Santiago de Compostela along the Camino de Santiago.

Demography

References

External links

Navarra.com/camino/puente.htm
Puente La Reina / Gares in the Bernardo Estornés Lasa – Auñamendi Encyclopedia (Euskomedia Fundazioa) 
Walking the Camino de Santiago, A Guide The site has great photos of the bridge at six in the morning as the sun rises.

Municipalities in Navarre